The population of Shias in Africa is composed of several communities:

 Persecuted Shia adherents in northern Nigeria, particularly the African Shia Islamic Movement called Islamic Movement of Nigeria  (IMN) headed by Sheikh Ibraheem Zakzaky in Zaria, Kaduna State.
 Shia Islam in Senegal is practiced by native Senegalese and also the Lebanese community in Senegal. One of their primary leaders was Lebanese Sheikh Abdul-Mun'am Az-zain, who primarily served the Lebanese community. The Sheikh built Shi'a schools and mosques and also provided scholarships to Senegalese students. 1% of Senegalese people practice Shi'a Islam. Major Shia organizations in Senegal include the Mozdahir International Institute, headed by Senegalese Shi'i religious leader Cherif Mohamed Aly Aidara.
 Highly persecuted low-profile Shia Muslims in Egypt.
 According to two studies by the Pew Research Center around 10% of Muslims Tanzania are Shia. 
 Ismaili communities, most of which were established by immigrants from South Asia. These populations are found in:
 East Africa, particularly Tanganyika, Kenya, Uganda, Malagasy, and Zanzibar.  Such groups include the Khoja, who are primarily Ismaili
 Central Africa, Burundi, Rwanda, and Zaire
 South Africa

African Shia Islamic Movement 
African Shia Islamic Movement is a Nigeria-based organization. Sheikh Ibraheem Zakzaky is the leader of the movement. It was founded in the 1980s, after Zakzaky traveled to Iran and was inspired by the 1979 Iranian Revolution. In 2014, a procession of Shias celebrating Quds Day attempted to pass a military checkpoint. A standoff ensued, with the Nigerian soldiers firing warning shots at the protesting Shias, who reportedly responded by throwing rocks at the soldiers, who then opened fire, reportedly killing 35 Shias, among them three of Zakzaky's children. In 2015, IMN protestors blocked a public road which a convoy containing Nigerian general Tukur Buratai was attempting to pass. The incident was described by the Nigerian military as an assassination attempt, a charge which the IMN denies. In retaliation, the Nigerian military launched a series of raids in the ancient town of Zaria, claiming it was in an effort to preempt attacks from the IMN. These raids resulted in the deaths of reportedly as many as 300 Nigerian Shias. Zakzaky himself was wounded and captured, along with one of his wives, and charges of murder were brought against him over the road blocking incident earlier that year. In 2019, protests broke out once more as a delegation belonging to the IMN stormed the National Assembly in Abuja to protest the continued incarceration of Zakzaky. The resulting melee killed at least two, though details of the incident are unclear. These protests moved the Nigerian government to officially ban the IMN on July 28, 2019, citing "acts of terrorism and illegality." Exactly two years later, Zakzaky would be released, after a court cleared him of all charges.

Nizari Ism'ailis in East Africa 
The most prominent Shia presence in Africa is in East Africa, where followers are almost all of the Ismaili sect, most of which being a result of a deliberate effort by Aga Khan III, the 47th imam of the Nizari Ismaili sect of Islam. However, Shias have lived in East Africa as early as the sixteenth century, with one story claiming the first Shia to migrate to the region having done so while assisting Vasco da Gama.

You want to know the first member of our family to be in Africa and when? Well, hisname was Mohamed, and he was known as ‘Kana Maalim’. That name means “Master of the Tiller’, because in the language of Gujarbhadalat, which is where we Badalas are from, the word for tiller, or rudder, is ‘sukhan’. He was the who showed Vasco De Gama the way from Malindi to India''''

Shias began migrating in greater numbers to East Africa with the establishment of the Omani Sultanate in 1840, becoming merchants and readers along the coast. A few decades later, the immigration of Ismaili Shias from India to East Africa greatly increased, as the Aga Khan's efforts to encourage migration began. British official Sir Bartle Frere estimated that more than 700 Ismaili families lived in Zanzibar in 1876, an increase of about three hundred in the past 16 years, a wave of immigration which can be traced directly to "the advice of the imam (Aga Khan III)." The Ismaili community in western India had been stricken with poverty and famine, and the edicts of the imam encouraging migration were done in an attempt for his followers to find greater economic opportunity while remaining under British protection. The current Aga Khan remains active in the region, and has founded a development network dedicated to improving the economic conditions of Ismaili communities around the world, including the East African countries of Kenya, Tanzania, Uganda, Rwanda, and Mozambique, where most of the migrants who left India in the late 19th and early 20th centuries moved to.

In 1972, Ugandan President Idi Amin ordered the expulsion of all persons of Asian descent from Uganda, which included the Nizari Ismailis. The Aga Khan IV called then-Canadian Prime Minister Pierre Trudeau, whose government accepted thousands of Nizaris into Canada.

Egypt 

Historically, Egypt was ruled for two centuries by the Ismaili Shia Fatimid Caliphate. Egypt came under Sunni control with the rise of Saladin and the Ayyubid Sultanate in the 12th century. This history has created a complicated situation in Egypt with regards to the Sunni-Shia divide, with a common saying being "Egypt is Sunni by Sect, Shia in temperament." An accurate estimation of the current number of Shia muslims in Egypt is difficult to attain, ranging from as few as 50,000 to as many as 2 million adherents. Today, Shias face persecution in modern Egypt, though the situation for them may be slowly improving. While President Abdel Fattah el-Sisi and Egypt's powerful Salafist movement have both characterized Shias as having deviated from proper Islamic tradition, and accused the sect of working with Iran to spread a renewed, Shia Persian Empire, actual treatment of Shias by the Egyptian government has been less harsh since the ousting of Mohammed Morsi in 2013. Sunni-Shia tensions in Egypt had previously reached a breaking point when a Salafi mob, motivated by anti-Shia rhetoric by the Muslim Brotherhood and President Morsi, lynched four Shias in Cairo in 2013.Hosni Mubarak's administration, meanwhile, imprisoned more than 300 Shias in 2009 without justification.

See also 
 Qibla (group), a Shi'a militant organization in South Africa
 Cherif Mohamed Aly Aidara, a Shi'a Senegalese religious leader

References